A balanced job complex is a collection of tasks within a given workplace that is balanced for its equity and empowerment implications against all other job complexes in that workplace. It was developed as an alternative to the corporate division of labor.

Balanced job complexes are central to the theory of participatory economics which emerged from the work of radical theorist Michael Albert and that of radical economist Robin Hahnel.

See also
Job rotation, a different form of changing roles
Kibbutz, Israeli communities with similar balance of roles
Work From Everywhere
Participatory economics

References

3. Gayathiri, M., & Ramakarishnan, D. (2013). Quality of Work-Life Linjage with Job Satisfaction and Performance. International Journal of Business and Management Invention, 2(1), 01-08 
4. Yadav, R., & Dabhade, N. (2013). Work Life Balance and Job Satisfaction Among the Working Women of Banking and Education Sector: A Comparative Study. Journal of Advancement in Education and Social Sciences, 1(2), 17-30.

Employee relations